Mabel Phoebe Darlington (5 December 1916 – 1999) was a Canadian-born international lawn bowls competitor for England.

Bowls career
In 1977 she won the silver medal in the fours at the 1977 World Outdoor Bowls Championship in Worthing with Margaret Lockwood, Joan Hunt and Joan Sparkes.

After taking up bowls in 1951 she won the 1961 singles title at the England Women's National Championships when bowling for Warwickshire.

Also won the Leamington Open four times.

References

1916 births
1999 deaths
English female bowls players
Canadian bowls players
Sportspeople from Toronto
English people of Canadian descent